Nivigne et Suran is a commune in the department of Ain, eastern France. The municipality was established on 1 January 2017 by merger of the former communes of Chavannes-sur-Suran and Germagnat.

Politics and administration

Municipal administration

List of mayors of Nivigne et Suran

List of delegated mayors for Chavannes-sur-Suran and Germagnat 
In addition to the mayor for the commune as a whole, each of the former municipalities are also represented by a delegated mayor to the conseil municipal.

See also 
Communes of the Ain department

References 

Communes of Ain

Communes nouvelles of Ain
Populated places established in 2017
2017 establishments in France